The Best of Strange Cargos is a compilation album by electronic instrumentalist William Orbit. In it, selected tracks from the first three of Orbit's four-album Strange Cargo series are included. All recordings in the compilation — including a 1993 remix of 1992's "Water From A Vine Leaf" — preceded the 1995 album release of Strange Cargo Hinterland. Three other tracks are also remixes, versions which were not released on initial Strange Cargo series albums.

Track listing
All music and lyrics by William Orbit.

1996 compilation albums
William Orbit albums
Albums produced by William Orbit
I.R.S. Records compilation albums